Vijayanagara architecture of 1336–1565 CE was a notable building idiom that developed during the rule of the imperial Hindu Vijayanagara Empire. The empire ruled South India, from their regal capital at Vijayanagara, on the banks of the Tungabhadra River in modern Karnataka, India. The empire built temples, monuments, palaces and other structures across South India, with a largest concentration in its capital. The monuments in and around Hampi, in the Vijayanagara principality, are listed as a UNESCO World Heritage Site.

In addition to building new temples, the empire added new structures and made modifications to hundreds of temples across South India. Some structures at Vijayanagara are from the pre-Vijayanagara period. The Mahakuta hill temples are from the Western Chalukya era. The region around Hampi had been a popular place of worship for centuries before the Vijayanagara period with earliest records dating from 689 CE when it was known as Pampa Tirtha after the local river God Pampa.

There are hundreds of monuments in the core area of the capital city. Of these, 56 are protected by UNESCO, 654 monuments are protected by the government of Karnataka and another 300 await protection.

Salient features

Vijayanagara architecture can be broadly classified into religious, courtly and civic architecture, as can the associated sculptures and paintings. The Vijayanagara style is a combination of the Chalukya, Hoysala, Rashtrakuta, Pandya and Chola styles which evolved earlier in the centuries when these empires ruled and is characterised by a return to the simplistic and serene art of the past.
Large  multi-purpose halls (mandapas) surrounding the main shrine with elaborate and intricately carved pillars and the tall entrance towers (Gopurams, more specifically Rayagopurams named after the ruling Rayas) are two notable Vijayanagara additions to South Indian temple architectural tradition.

For the approximately 400 years during the rule of the Western Chalukya and the Hoysalas empires, the most popular material for temple construction was chloritic schist or soapstone. This was also true for sculpture as soapstone is soft and easily carved. During the Vijayanagar period the local hard granite was preferred in the Badami Chalukya style, although soapstone was used for a few reliefs and sculptures. While the use of granite reduced the density of sculptured works, granite was a more durable material for the temple structure. Because granite is prone to flaking, few pieces of individual sculptures reached the high levels of quality seen in previous centuries. To cover the unevenness of the stone used in sculptures, artists employed  plaster to give the rough surface a smooth finish and then painted it with lively colours.

Temple structures
Vijayanagara temples are usually surrounded by a strong enclosure. Small shrines consist simply of a garbhagriha (sanctum) and a porch. Medium-sized temples have a garbhagriha, shukanasi (antechamber), a navaranga (antrala) connecting the sanctum and outer mandapa (hall), and a rangamantapa (enclosed pillared hall). Large temples have tall Rayagopuram built with wood, brick and stucco in Chola style. The term Raya is added to indicate a gopura built by Vijayanagar Rayas. The top of the gopuram has a shalashikhara resembling a barrel made to rest on its side. Large life-size figures of men, woman, Gods and Goddesses adorn the gopuram. This Tamil dravida-influenced style became popular during the rule of king Krishnadevaraya and is seen in South Indian temples constructed over the next 200 years. Examples of Rayagopuram are the Chennakesava Temple in Belur and the temples at Srisailam and Srirangam. In addition to these structures, medium-size temples have a closed circumambulatory (Pradakshinapatha) passage around the sanctum, an open mahamantapa (large hall), a kalyanamantapa (ceremonial hall) and a temple tank to serve the needs of annual celebrations.

Temple pillars often have engravings of charging horses or hippogryphs (Yali) — horses standing on hind legs with their forelegs lifted and riders on their backs. The horses on some pillars stand seven to eight feet tall. On the other side of the pillar are usually carvings from Hindu mythology. Pillars that do not have such hippogryphs are generally rectangular with mythology-themed decoration on all sides. Some pillars have a cluster of smaller pillars around a central pillar shaft. The bottom supports of these pillars have engravings of gods and goddesses. Carvings of hippogryphs clearly show the adroitness of the artists who created them.

The Mandapas are built on square or polygonal plinths with carved friezes that are four to five feet high and have ornate stepped entrances on all four sides with miniature elephants or with Yali balustrades (parapets). The Mantapas are supported by ornate pillars. The 1,000-pillared style with large halls supported by numerous pillars was popular. The 1,000-pillared Jain basadi at Mudabidri is an example. Larger temples have a separate shrine for the female deity. Some examples of this are the Hazara Rama, Balakrishna and Vitthala temples at Hampi.

Some shrines in the Vitthalapura area inside Vijayanagara were consecrated specifically for Tamil Alwar saints and for the great Vaishnava saint, Ramanujacharya. Architecturally they are different in that each shrine has an image depicting the saint for whose worship the temple was built. Each shrine has its own enclosure and a separate kitchen and pilgrim-feeding hall. The water storage tank inside the royal center, the [stepwell stepped tank] called "Pushkarni", is a recent archaeological discovery. The stepped tank is fashioned with finished chlorite schist slabs arranged in a symmetrical formation with steps and landings descending to the water on all four sides. This is clearly a Western Chalukya-Hoysala style tank and is seen in many parts of present-day Karnataka. The inscriptions on the slabs indicate the material was brought from outside the Vijayanagara area.

Palaces
Much of what is known today of Vijayanagara palaces is drawn from archaeological excavations at Hampi as no royal palace structures have survived. Most palaces stand in their own compound defined by high tapering walls made of stone or layered earth. Palaces are approached through a sequence of courts with passageways and doorways requiring multiple changes in direction. All palaces face east or north. The larger palaces have side extensions giving the complex a symmetrical shape.

Palaces were built on raised platforms made of granite. The platforms have multiple tiers of mouldings with well-decorated friezes. The decorations can be floral, Kirtimukha shapes (demon faces), geese, elephants and occasionally human figures. Pillars, beams and rafters inside the palace were made of wood as evidenced by ash discovered in excavations. The roof was made of brick or lime concrete, while copper and ivory were used for finials. Palaces commonly consisted of multiple levels with each flight of stairs decorated by balustrades on either side, with either  yali (imaginary beast) or elephant sculptures. The  entrance steps into palaces and temple mantapas were similarly decorated. Water tanks inside the palace complex have decorative water spouts such as the carved torso of the Nandi with a gaping mouth to allow water flow into the tank. Other structures commonly found inside a palace complex are wells and shrines.

The courtly architecture generally show secular styles with Islamic influences. Examples are the Lotus Mahal palace, Elephant stables, and watch towers. Courtly buildings and domed structures were built with mortar mixed with stone rubble.

The impact of this style of architecture was seen well into the 17th century when the successive Nayaka kingdoms continued to encourage pillars with hippogryphs and granite became the main building material.

Other famous temples in Karnataka

While the empire is well known for its monuments in the regal capital Vijayanagara (a UNESCO World Heritage Site), it also built temples in other regions of Karnataka including the coastal region (called Karavali) where the Vijayanagara idiom mingled with local styles. A List of these temples and their approximate time of construction is given in the article List of Vijayanagara era temples in Karnataka.

Famous temples in Andhra Pradesh
In Andhra Pradesh the empire built the Mallikarjuna Temple at Srisailam, Upper Narasimha Temple and Lower Narasimha Temple at Ahobilam, Veera Bhadra Temple at Lepakshi and Venkateswara Temple at Tirupati and others. In Tamil Nadu the empire built the Vijayaraghava Permal temple modeled after the famous temples at Tirupati with statues of Krishnadevaraya in Thayar Sanithi pillars facing each other.

Gallery

Terminology
 Mantapa – pillared hall
 Mahamantapa – Open pillared hall
 Rangamantapa – Closed pillared hall
 Kalyanamantapa – Hall meant for celebrations and special occasions
 Garbhagriha – Sanctum where the idol of God is placed
 Navaranga or Antrala – passage the connects different Sanctums
 Shukanasi – Antechamber

See also
 Vijayanagara
 Hampi
 Lepakshi
 Srikalahasti
 Vijayanagar Empire
 Hoysala architecture
 Indian architecture

Notes

References

Incredible India Hampi Guide
 Dr. Suryanath.M.U.Kamat, A Concise history of Karnataka from pre-historic times to the present, Jupiter books, MCC, Bangalore, 2001 (Reprinted 2002) OCLC: 7796041 
 Hampi, A Travel Guide, Department of Tourism, India, Good Earth publication, New Delhi 2003  
 New Light on Hampi, Recent research in Vijayanagara, edited by John M. Fritz and George Michell, MARG, 2001, 
  History of Karnataka, Arthikaje
 Temples of Karnataka, Dr. Jyotsna Kamat
 Architecture of Indian Subcontinent, Takeyo Kameya
 TempleNet:Temples of India
 www.Hampi.in: A website with photographs, descriptions and the site maps of the Hampi ruins.

Indian architectural history
Art and culture of Vijayanagar Empire
Architecture of Karnataka